The UK Rock & Metal Albums Chart is a record chart which ranks the best-selling rock and heavy metal albums in the United Kingdom. Compiled and published by the Official Charts Company, the data is based on each album's weekly physical sales, digital downloads and streams. In 2010, there were 22 albums that topped the 52 published charts. The first number-one album of the year was Muse's fifth studio album The Resistance, which was released the previous year. The first new number-one album of the year was Screamworks: Love in Theory and Practice, the seventh studio album by Finnish gothic rock band HIM. The final number-one album of the year was the Foo Fighters compilation Greatest Hits, which topped the chart for a total of four weeks over four separate spells in 2010.

The most successful album on the UK Rock & Metal Albums Chart in 2010 was Muse's 2009 release The Resistance, which spent a total of eleven weeks at number one. Led Zeppelin's 2007 compilation Mothership spent six weeks at number one in 2011, including a three-week run between 30 October and 13 November. AC/DC's Iron Man 2 soundtrack spent five weeks at number one and was the best-selling rock and metal album of the year, ranking 39th in the UK End of Year Albums Chart. Greatest Hits by Foo Fighters and the eponymous debut solo album by guitarist Slash each spent four weeks at number one; Linkin Park's A Thousand Suns and Avenged Sevenfold's Nightmare were both number one for three weeks; and Iron Maiden's The Final Frontier spent two weeks at number one in 2010.

Chart history

See also
2010 in British music
List of UK Rock & Metal Singles Chart number ones of 2010

References

External links
Official UK Rock & Metal Albums Chart Top 40 at the Official Charts Company
The Official UK Top 40 Rock Albums at BBC Radio 1

2010 in British music
United Kingdom Rock and Metal Albums
2010